Potassium voltage-gated channel subfamily C member 2 is a protein that in humans is encoded by the KCNC2 gene. The protein encoded by this gene is a voltage-gated potassium channel subunit (Kv3.2).

Expression pattern

Kv3.1 and Kv3.2 channels are prominently expressed in neurons that fire at high frequency. Kv3.2 channels are prominently expressed in brain (fast-spiking GABAergic interneurons of the neocortex, hippocampus, and caudate nucleus; terminal fields of thalamocortical projections), and in retinal ganglion cells.

Physiological role 

Kv3.1/Kv3.2 conductance is necessary and kinetically optimized for high-frequency action potential generation. Sometimes in heteromeric complexes with Kv3.1; important for the high-frequency firing of fast spiking GABAergic interneurons and retinal ganglion cells; and GABA release via regulation of action potential duration in presynaptic terminals.

Pharmacological properties 

Kv3.2 currents in heterologous systems are highly sensitive to external tetraethylammonium (TEA) or 4-aminopyridine (4-AP) (IC50 values are 0.1 mM for both of the drugs). This can be useful in identifying native channels.

Transcript variants 

There are four transcript variants of Kv3.2 gene: Kv3.2a, Kv3.2b, Kv3.2c, Kv3.2d. Kv3.2 isoforms differ only in their C-terminal sequence.

References

External links 
 
 

Ion channels